Geoffrey Mains (24 January 1934 – 16 April 2021) was an English cricketer. Mains was a right-handed batsman who bowled right-arm fast-medium. He was born at Mangotsfield, Gloucestershire.

Mains made his first-class debut for Gloucestershire against the touring South Africans in 1951 at Ashley Down Ground, Bristol. He made five further first-class appearances for the county, the last of which came against Oxford University in 1954 at Ashley Down Ground. In his six first-class matches, took 6 wickets at an average of 50.83, with best figures of 2/42. With the bat, he scored 19 runs at an average of 2.11, with a high score of 8.

References

External links
Geoffrey Mains at ESPNcricinfo
Geoffrey Mains at CricketArchive

1934 births
2021 deaths
People from Mangotsfield
English cricketers
Gloucestershire cricketers
Sportspeople from Gloucestershire